Frank Marcellus Boyce (August 3, 1851 – 1931) was an American physician and politician from New York.

Life
He was born on August 3, 1851, in Schodack, Rensselaer County, New York, the son of Anson Mead Boyce (1828–1878) and Caroline (Stewart) Boyce (1833–1889). He attended the public schools in Saratoga Springs. He graduated from Albany Medical College in 1872, was licensed to practice medicine by the Columbia University College of Physicians and Surgeons in 1873, and practiced medicine in Saratoga Springs. On February 5, 1874, he married Kate Payne (1852–1889), and they had three children.

He was Coroner of Saratoga County from 1878 to 1881; a trustee of the Village of Saratoga Springs from 1881 to 1888; Supervisor of the Town of Saratoga Springs in 1889; and a member of the New York State Assembly (Saratoga Co., 2nd D.) in 1890.

In 1891, he returned to Schodack where he lived on a farm and practiced medicine. On August 9, 1896, he married Emma Van Buren (1857–1935). He was Supervisor of the Town of Schodack in 1896; and a member of the New York State Senate (30th D.) in 1899 and 1900.

He was again a member of the State Senate (29th D.) in 1907 and 1908.

He died in 1931; and was buried at the Woodlawn Cemetery in Schodack, New York.

Legacy
His son, Frank Marcellus Boyce, Jr., wrote a book on Women's Suffrage in 1913. 
The book is titled Governor Jane: a story of the new woman.

Sources

1851 births
1931 deaths
Democratic Party New York (state) state senators
People from Schodack, New York
Democratic Party members of the New York State Assembly
Politicians from Saratoga Springs, New York
Town supervisors in New York (state)
Albany Medical College alumni